Wendell Foster (February 14, 1924 - September 3, 2019) was an American politician who served on the New York City Council from 1978 to 2001.

References

1924 births
2019 deaths
New York City Council members
New York (state) Democrats
African-American New York City Council members